Budd Creek is a stream in Yosemite National Park, United States.

Budd Creek was named for James Budd, 19th Governor of California.

See also
List of rivers of California

References

Rivers of Tuolumne County, California
Rivers of Northern California